Darius Junior Osei (born 1 February 1996) is an English professional footballer who plays for South Shields as a striker.

Career
After beginning his career with Stalybridge Celtic, he signed a one-year contract with Oldham Athletic in July 2016. He scored his first goals for Oldham when he scored twice in an EFL Trophy tie against Carlisle United on 30 August 2016.

On 9 January 2018, after being released by Oldham, Osei joined National League side Maidstone United on a deal until the end of the 2017–18 season. Osei featured nine times, scoring once before being released in May 2018.

in September 2019 he rejoined Stalybridge Celtic. In February 2020 he moved to South Shields. In October 2022, Osei joined Ashton United on loan.

Career statistics

References

1996 births
Living people
English footballers
Association football forwards
Stalybridge Celtic F.C. players
Oldham Athletic A.F.C. players
Maidstone United F.C. players
South Shields F.C. (1974) players
Ashton United F.C. players
English Football League players
National League (English football) players
Northern Premier League players